Ludovic Golliard (born 13 March 1983) is a French professional footballer who currently plays for Besançon Football. He played at professional level in Ligue 2 for Besançon RC and US Creteil.

References

External links
 Profile at Soccerway
 Profile at L'Équipe

1983 births
Living people
Sportspeople from Besançon
Association football defenders
French footballers
US Créteil-Lusitanos players
Racing Besançon players
RC Strasbourg Alsace players
Ligue 2 players
Footballers from Bourgogne-Franche-Comté